"Magdalen Sky" is a song written by Mark Gardener and Kaye Denham.  The song was released as Gardener's debut solo single in June 1997 by Shifty Disco Records, following the 1996 break-up of Gardener's previous band Ride.  The single was part of Shifty Disco's "Single of the Month" club and had a limited run of 1,000 copies only.  The single features the rare B-side "Can't Let It Die", which was also written by Gardener and Denham.

As well as appearing on the Shifty Disco Records' year-end singles compilation It's A Shifty Disco Thing Vol. 1, "Magdalen Sky" was also included on Gardener's debut solo album, These Beautiful Ghosts.

Track listing
"Magdalen Sky" (Mark Gardener, Kaye Denham) - 3:39
"Can't Let It Die" [Home Demo in the Attic] (Mark Gardener, Kaye Denham) - 3:23

References

External links
Mark Gardener Official Website

1997 singles